Baihong is a Southern Loloish language of Yunnan, China. It is spoken in Jiangcheng Hani and Yi Autonomous County, Mojiang Hani Autonomous County, Yuanjiang Hani, Yi and Dai Autonomous County, Lüchun County, and Yuanyang County, Yunnan.

The Diema 垤玛 dialect of Honghe County is a Baihong variety.

References

Bai Bibo [白碧波] (2010). Sociolinguistics of languages of Yinyuan Town, Yuanjiang County [元江县因远镇语言使用现状及其演变]. Beijing: Ethnic Publishing House [民族出版社]. 
Minta Minji [敏塔敏吉]; Zhao Dewen [赵德文]; Jiang Hao [蒋浩]. 2014. Wenhua shiying yu shehui bianqian - Mojiang Hanizu Baihong zhixi wenhua shizheng [文化适应于社会变迁-墨江哈尼族白宏支系文化实证]. Kunming: Yunnan Arts Press [云南美朮出版社]. 
You Weiqiong [尤伟琼]. 2013. Classifying ethnic groups of Yunnan [云南民族识别研究]. Beijing: Nationalities Press [民族出版社].

Southern Loloish languages
Languages of Yunnan